Muss or MUSS may refer to:

 Eiryn Muss, a secondary character in The Well of Echoes
 Jake "the Muss" Heke, a fictional character in Once Were Warriors
 Stephen Muss (born 1929), American real estate developer 
 Sancti Spíritus Airport, Cuba, ICAO code MUSS
 MUSS (countermeasure), an active protection system to protect military vehicles